Luck is an American dramatic television series created by David Milch and starring Dustin Hoffman. Set in the world of horse racing, the pilot episode was directed by Michael Mann. The series premiered on January 29, 2012. HBO aired the first episode on December 11, 2011, as a preview. It was immediately renewed for a second season of 10 episodes, scheduled to air beginning in January 2013. However, the series was canceled on March 14, 2012, due to animal safety concerns. Three horses died during production of the series. The first season's remaining episodes continued to air. The complete first season was released on DVD and Blu-ray on November 27, 2012.

Cast

 Dustin Hoffman as Chester "Ace" Bernstein
 Dennis Farina as Gus Demitriou
 John Ortiz as Turo Escalante
 Richard Kind as Joey Rathburn
 Kevin Dunn as Marcus Becker
 Ian Hart as Lonnie McHinery
 Ritchie Coster as Renzo Calagari
 Jason Gedrick as Jerry Boyle
 Kerry Condon as Rosie Shanahan
 Gary Stevens as Ronnie Jenkins
 Tom Payne as Leon Micheaux
 Jill Hennessy as Jo Carter
 Nick Nolte as Walter Smith
 Michael Gambon as Michael "Mike" Smythe
 Ted Levine as Isadore Cohen
 Patrick J. Adams as Nathan Israel
 Barry Shabaka Henley as Parole Officer
 Chantal Sutherland as Lizzy (Rosie's friend)
 Weronika Rosati as Naomi

Episodes

Production

Before creating Luck, David Milch had worked in television for three decades. He started off as a writer on the series Hill Street Blues before co-creating NYPD Blue with Steven Bochco and creating the HBO series Deadwood.
Milch had been fascinated by horse racing from an early age, as his father would take him to the track. "My dad started taking me to Saratoga at age 5 or 6. You have so many associations from childhood that stay with you." He stated that he had been thinking about creating the series for 25 years and always pictured that it would be set at Santa Anita Park. "It's the most beautiful setting for horse racing that I've seen, and I'd include Saratoga," he said.

The character of on-the-skids jockey Ronnie is portrayed by racing fixture Gary Stevens, a Hall of Fame jockey who has won the Kentucky Derby, the Preakness Stakes and the Belmont Stakes in the course of his career. Stevens portrayed jockey George Woolf in the 2003 film Seabiscuit.

The series used 50 horses trained by Matt Chew at Santa Anita. Milch stated, "Because it's a natural tendency for horses to want to be a part of a herd, most adapt to it very well. We have a couple individuals that have been taught to be race horses; we're not going to get that out of their system. We'll just have to adapt to it. But of the 50 horses, I'd say 45 of them have adapted to it real well."

Safety concerns and cancellation
The safety of the series' working environment was called into question by People for the Ethical Treatment of Animals (PETA), which criticized Luck over the injury and euthanization of two horses during filming for the pilot and the seventh episode. The American Humane Association (AHA) said both racehorses "stumbled and fell during short racing sequences" and that "the horses were checked immediately afterwards by the onsite veterinarians and in each case a severe fracture deemed the condition inoperable". HBO pointed out that precautions had been taken: each horse was "limited to three runs per day and was rested in between those runs".  On March 13, 2012, HBO agreed to suspend all filming involving horses while investigations took place over the death of a third horse.  The AHA insisted the stoppage remain in effect until a comprehensive investigation was completed; it also noted the horse's injury did not occur during filming or racing. The following day, HBO canceled the series, saying that while it "maintained the highest safety standards throughout production... accidents unfortunately happen and it is impossible to guarantee they won't in the future."

At the time of the series' cancellation, the second episode of the second season was in production. Footage shot for the second season has not been released publicly.

Reception

Critical reception 
Luck received positive reviews from television critics.  On the review aggregator website Metacritic, the first season scored 75/100, indicating "Generally favorable reviews".

Linda Stasi from the New York Post said in her review, "With an impossibly good cast, writing so spot-on it's poetic, and slow-build stories, I, for one, was left wanting more—even after watching the entire season." Alessandra Stanley of The New York Times, on the other hand, found the show "needlessly opaque". Newsday's Verne Gay praised the talent behind the series: "There are three excellent reasons—Milch, Mann and Hoffman—why your faith will be rewarded." Alan Sepinwall from HitFix called the series "clear and engaging" and singled out Hoffman's performance: "Hoffman is the big name, and gives an impressively buttoned-down performance."

Some criticism focused on the opacity of the plot, the apparent lack of attractive characters, and their audibility.

Ratings 
The December 2011 preview episode garnered a total of 1.14 million viewers on its original airing with a 0.36 ratings share among adults 18–49. The official series premiere, which was shown on January 29, 2012, garnered 1.06 million viewers with a 0.3 ratings share. The viewership reached its second lowest mark with the seventh episode at 474,000 viewers and 0.14 share.

Music
The theme song for the series is "Splitting the Atom" by Massive Attack.

International distribution

References

External links
Official website
 
 Understanding Luck at HelloRaceFans.com

2010s American drama television series
2011 American television series debuts
2012 American television series endings
English-language television shows
Television shows about gambling
HBO original programming
Television series by Warner Bros. Television Studios
Horse racing mass media
Santa Anita Park
Television shows set in Los Angeles
Television series created by David Milch
Television series about organized crime